Bjørg Aase Sørensen (18 February 1944 – 16 June 2010) was a Norwegian sociologist. She was senior researcher at the Work Research Institute, professor at Vestfold University College and adjunct professor at the University of Oslo. She was editor-in-chief of Acta Sociologica from 1974 to 1976.

References

1944 births
2010 deaths
Norwegian sociologists
Academic staff of the University of Oslo
Academic staff of Vestfold University College
Work Research Institute people